Anthony Gordon Steel (31 July 1941 – 4 May 2018) was a New Zealand rugby union player, politician and educator.

Early years
He was born in Greymouth, and played rugby first for his school, Christchurch Boys' High School, and then for Canterbury before finally playing for the All Blacks between 1966 and 1968. He was a part of the All Blacks 1967 New Zealand rugby union tour of Britain, France and Canada.

After retiring from sport due to injury, he took up teaching, first at the Brisbane Grammar School and then back in New Zealand. He eventually became headmaster of Hamilton Boys' High School.

Member of Parliament

In the 1990 election, he stood for Parliament as a candidate for the National Party, defeating Labour's Bill Dillon in the Hamilton East electorate. In the 1993 election, however, he was defeated by Labour's Dianne Yates. He regained the seat in the 1996 election, and retained it in the 1999 election, but in the 2002 election, he was defeated again by Dianne Yates. Having opted not to seek a position on National's party list, Steel left Parliament. Testament to Steel's popularity in the city of Hamilton is the fact that he lost what has traditionally been regarded as a bellwether seat by a mere 600 votes, in an election where the National Party was almost destroyed by its lowest polling result in recent history.

Death
Steel died in Hamilton on 4 May 2018.

Legacy
In 2000, an extra house was added at Hamilton Boys' High School, named Steel house, after Tony Steel. Apart from Argyle House (the boarding house), all of the other houses are also named after former Headmasters.
Tony Steel also won the New Zealand 100/200metres Sprint double at the 1965-66 New Zealand Track and Field Championships representing Canterbury as well as being a member of the winning Canterbury 4x100 metres Team that took Gold

See also 
High School Old Boys RFC

References

External links
 

1941 births
2018 deaths
21st-century New Zealand politicians
Canterbury rugby union players
Members of the New Zealand House of Representatives
New Zealand international rugby union players
New Zealand male sprinters
New Zealand MPs for North Island electorates
New Zealand National Party MPs
New Zealand rugby union players
New Zealand schoolteachers
New Zealand sportsperson-politicians
People educated at Christchurch Boys' High School
Rugby union players from Greymouth
Rugby union wings
Unsuccessful candidates in the 1993 New Zealand general election
Heads of schools in New Zealand